Platysace cirrosa, commonly known as karna, is a perennial herb that is endemic to Western Australia. The Noongar name for the plant is kanna.

The plant has a twining tuberous habit. The herb or climber blooms between January and March producing yellow flowers. It is found along slopes and drainage lines in the Wheatbelt and Mid West regions where it grows in lateritic or loamy soils over granite.

The species was first described by the botanist Alexander Bunge 1845 in the Umbelliferae section of Johann Georg Christian Lehmann's Plantae Preissianae.

References

cirrosa
Flora of Western Australia
Plants described in 1845
Taxa named by Alexander von Bunge